BBC Radio Sheffield is the BBC's local radio station serving South Yorkshire and north Derbyshire.

It broadcasts on FM, DAB, digital television and via BBC Sounds from studios on Shoreham Street in Sheffield.

According to RAJAR, the station has a weekly audience of 160,000 listeners and a 3.9% share as of December 2022.

History
BBC Radio Sheffield was the second BBC local radio station, launching on 15 November 1967 and broadcasting from a large Victorian house in Westbourne Road in the Broomhill area of the city.

Until the mid-1980s, the station was generally on air from the morning until the early evening, with any programming after 6 pm devoted to specialist music and magazines aimed at minority interests and ethnic communities. These programmes did not broadcast all year round. In August 1986, evening programmes began on a permanent basis when the station joined with the other three BBC stations in Yorkshire to provide an early evening service of specialist music programmes on weeknights from 6pm to 7:30pm, extending a year later to six days a week (Wednesday to Monday) between 7pm and 9pm with Tuesdays reserved for local sports coverage. May 1989 saw the launch of BBC Night Network which saw the BBC Local Radio stations in the North of England broadcasting networked programming every evening from 6:05pm (6pm at the weekend) and midnight, extending to 12:30am in the early 1990s, and to 1am by the end of that decade.

Spring 1989 also saw BBC Radio Sheffield launch a weekend evening service of programmes for the county's ethnic minority communities called Ten-35. Radio Sheffield had provided programmes for the Asian and black communities for many years but the new service saw the launch of programmes for many other communities. The service was broadcast on MW on Saturday and Sunday evenings between 6 pm and midnight although the Sunday programming was brought forward to 2.45 pm to 8.30 pm in around 1991 and was called Ten-35 Sunday. Over time the service was dismantled and eventually programming for minority communities was again focussed on the black and Asian communities.

Archives
In March 1982, archiving began of the station's early material, by cataloguing and transferring it to audio cassette. The first items archived were news reports of the steel strike of 1980. The cassettes and listings, which include news stories and local music, are held at Sheffield City Archives in Sheffield. This archiving followed a scheme by Radio Carlisle which covered the October 1957 Windscale nuclear accident.

Transmitters
The 104.1FM signal is broadcast at 2,500 ft from the Holme Moss transmitter in West Yorkshire, near the border with Derbyshire, enabling the signal to be clearly heard in north Sheffield, Barnsley, north Rotherham, Doncaster and parts of Nottinghamshire, as well as parts of West Yorkshire, southern areas of North Yorkshire and Greater Manchester.

The 88.6 FM signal is broadcast from the Crosspool transmitter on Tapton Hill to serve Sheffield and parts of Rotherham. It also broadcasts DAB on 11C multiplex for Sheffield and surrounding areas and it broadcasts DTR for South Yorkshire and surrounding areas for freeview TV channel 734 on UHF 27-522 MHz the BBCA multiplex.

The 94.7FM signal is broadcast from the Chesterfield transmitter and serves Derbyshire, parts of Nottinghamshire and the East of South Yorkshire. The Chesterfield signal can be heard as far south on the M1 as Copt Oak. It broadcasts DAB on 11C multiplex (same as Crosspool transmitter) for the Chesterfield and North Derbyshire area. It also broadcasts DTR for Chesterfield for freeview TV channel 734 on UHF 26-514 MHz on the BBCA multiplex.

A DAB signal is broadcast from the Clifton transmitter (next to the M18 east of Rotherham) to serve Rotherham, Doncaster, Worksop and surrounding areas. Another DAB signal is broadcast from Ardsley transmitter east of Barnsley to serve Barnsley, Dearne Valley and parts of West Yorkshire. Plus, its DAB signals are also broadcast from the Clarborough transmitter near Retford to cover parts of North Nottinghamshire and strengthen signals from the Clifton transmitter. The three transmitters use the Bauer South Yorkshire 11C multiplex (Same as Crosspool and Chesterfield transmitters).

The Emley Moor transmitter broadcasts DTR for Freeview TV channel 734 for Yorkshire, Derbyshire and parts of Lincolnshire on UHF 47-682 MHz the BBCA multiplex. Other local TV transmitters such as Crosspool relay their signal from Emley Moor.

While the FM, DAB and Freeview transmissions of BBC Radio Sheffield officially cover North Nottinghamshire, including the district of Bassetlaw which includes the towns of Retford and Worksop, editorially, news output is covered by BBC Radio Nottingham via its radio and internet news and social media channels, despite the area being officially outside the coverage area of BBC Radio Nottingham.

In its early years, Radio Sheffield transmitted from Rotherham (Boston Castle) on 95.05 MHz FM.  This was discontinued when a powerful transmitter opened at Holme Moss serving much of South Yorkshire on 97.4 MHz, later changing to its current 104.1 MHz (97.4 MHz was then passed to Radio Hallam).

The ownership of FM radios was low when Radio Sheffield began broadcasting on FM only in 1967.  However, most people could receive AM (medium wave (MW) and long wave (LW)) and, in response to the impending competition of commercial radio which would also broadcast on MW (Radio Hallam started in 1974), Radio Sheffield began transmitting in late 1973 on 1034 kHz (290 metres) MW – this changed to 1035 kHz in 1978. This was broadcast from the Broadfield Road transmitter in Sheffield (behind Heeley swimming baths) and served South Yorkshire, Derbyshire, Nottinghamshire and parts of Lincolnshire and West Yorkshire. The MW broadcasts were discontinued on 27 May 2021.

Programming
Local programming is produced and broadcast from the BBC's Sheffield studios from 6 am – 10 pm each day.

Off-peak programming, including the regional late show (10 pm – 1 am), originates from BBC Radio Leeds.

During the station's downtime, BBC Radio Sheffield simulcasts overnight programming from BBC Radio 5 Live and BBC Radio London.

Presenters

Toby Foster (Weekday breakfast)
Becky Measures (Weekend daytime)

Notable past presenters

Simon Clark (Sports presenter)
Tony Capstick
Simon Groom
Emlyn Hughes (deceased)
Ian MacMillan
Rony Robinson

See also
BBC Local Radio
BBC Night Network
BBC Radio Leeds
BBC Radio York
Hallam FM

References

External links
BBC Radio Sheffield website
Praise or Grumble History

Radio stations established in 1967
Sheffield
Mass media in Sheffield
Radio stations in Yorkshire